A number of opinion polls have been conducted regarding the premiership of Narendra Modi.

Overall approval

Graph
This shows only polls with known sample sizes meant to be representative of Indians. Global polls are not included.

Issue-specific

COVID-19
The government under Narendra Modi faced the COVID-19 pandemic in India.

Historical rankings
The "Mood of the Nation" survey conducted annually between 2016 and 2021 consistently listed Modi as the most popular prime minister among members of the Indian public. A YouGov-Mint-CPR survey in 2022 also ranked Modi first, ahead of Jawaharlal Nehru.

See also
 Opinion polling on the Jair Bolsonaro presidency

References

Narendra Modi
Opinion polling in India
Narendra Modi-related lists